This list of radio stations in Germany lists all radio stations broadcast in Germany, sorted first by legal status, then by area. Excluded from this list are Internet-only and cable-only radio stations.

The abbreviations LW, MW, SW, FM, DVB-S, DVB-T, DAB and DRM indicate the systems the radio station uses for broadcasting.

Public radio stations

National radio stations
Deutschlandfunk (FM, DAB, DVB-S)
Deutschlandfunk Kultur (FM, DAB, DVB-S)
Deutsche Welle (DVB-S)
Dokumente und Debatten (DVB-S, DAB)
Deutschlandfunk Nova (DAB, DVB-S)

Bayerischer Rundfunk (BR) 
Bayern 1 (FM, DAB, DVB-S, DVB-C, Internet)
Bayern 2 (FM, DAB, DVB-S, DVB-C, Internet)
Bayern 3 (FM, DAB, DVB-S, DVB-C, Internet)
BR-Klassik (FM, DAB, DVB-S, DVB-C, Internet)
BR24 (FM, DAB, DVB-S, DVB-C, Internet)
BR24live (DAB, DVB-S, DVB-C, Internet)
BR Heimat (DAB, DVB-S, DVB-C, Internet)
BR Schlager (DAB, DVB-S)
BR Verkehr (DAB)
Puls (DAB, DVB-S, DVB-C, Internet)

Hessischer Rundfunk (hr)
hr1 (FM, DAB+, DVB-C, DVB-S, Internet)
hr2 (FM, DAB+, DVB-C, DVB-S, Internet)
hr3 (FM, DAB+, DVB-C, DVB-S, Internet)
hr4 (FM, DAB+, DVB-C, DVB-S, Internet)
 hr4 Mitte
 hr4 Nord
 hr4 Rhein-Main
hr-info (FM, DAB+, DVB-C, DVB-S, Internet)
You FM (FM, DAB+, DVB-C, DVB-S, Internet)

Mitteldeutscher Rundfunk (MDR)
MDR
MDR Sachsen (FM, DVB-S)
MDR Sachsen-Anhalt (FM, DVB-S)
MDR Thüringen (FM, DVB-S)
MDR Aktuell (FM, DAB+, DVB-S)
MDR Jump (FM, DVB-S)
MDR Klassik (DAB)
MDR Kultur (FM, DVB-S)
MDR Schlagerwelt (DAB)
MDR Sputnik (FM, DAB, DVB-S)
MDR Tweens (DAB+)
Sorbischer Rundfunk (FM)

Norddeutscher Rundfunk (NDR)
NDR 1:
NDR 1 Niedersachsen (FM, DAB, DVB-S)
NDR 1 Radio MV (FM, DAB, DVB-S)
NDR 1 Welle Nord (FM, DAB, DVB-S)
NDR 90,3 (Hamburg) (FM, DAB, DVB)
NDR 2 (FM, DVB-S)
NDR Blue (DAB, DVB-S)
NDR Info (FM, DAB, DVB-S)
NDR Info Spezial (DVB-S)
NDR Kultur (FM, DVB-S)
N-JOY (FM, DVB-S)
NDR Schlager (DAB)

Radio Bremen (RB)
Bremen Eins (FM, DAB+, DVB-C, DVB-S, Internet)
Bremen Zwei (FM, DAB+, DVB-C, DVB-S, Internet)
Bremen Next (FM, DAB+, DVB-C, DVB-S, Internet)
Bremen Vier (FM, DAB+, DVB-C, DVB-S, Internet)
Bremen Fünf (FM, DAB+)
Bremen Cosmo (FM, DAB+, DVB-C, DVB-S, Internet)

Rundfunk Berlin-Brandenburg (rbb)
Antenne Brandenburg (FM, DAB+, DVB-S)
COSMO (FM, DAB+, DVB-S)
Fritz (FM, DAB+, DVB-S)
rbb24 Inforadio (FM, DAB+, DVB-S)
rbbKultur (FM, DAB+, DVB-S)
rbb 88,8 (FM, DAB+, DVB-S)
radioeins (FM, DAB+, DVB-S)
Sorbischer Rundfunk (FM)

Saarländischer Rundfunk (SR)
Antenne Saar (DAB)
SR 1 Europawelle (FM, DAB, DVB-S)
SR 2 Kulturradio (FM, DAB, DVB-S)
SR 3 Saarlandwelle (FM, DAB, DVB-S)
UNSER DING (FM, DAB)

Südwestrundfunk (SWR)
DASDING (FM, DAB, DVB-S, DAB+, Internet)
SWR1:
SWR1 Baden-Württemberg (FM, DAB, DVB-S)
SWR1 Rheinland-Pfalz (FM, DAB, DVB-S)
SWR2 (FM, DAB, DVB-S)
SWR3 (FM, DAB, DVB-S)
SWR4:
SWR4 Baden-Württemberg (FM, DVB-S)
SWR4 Rheinland-Pfalz (FM, DAB, DVB-S)
SWR Aktuell (FM, DAB, DVB-S)

Westdeutscher Rundfunk (WDR)
1LIVE (FM, DAB+, DVB-S)
1LIVE diggi (DAB+, DVB-S)
COSMO (FM, DAB+, DVB)
WDR 2 (FM, DAB+, DVB-S)
WDR 3 (FM, DAB+, DVB-S)
WDR 4 (FM, DAB+, DVB-S)
WDR 5 (FM, DAB+, DVB-S)
WDR Event (DAB+, DVB-S)
WDR VERA (DAB+)

Private radio stations

Radio stations which broadcast in more than one state

domradio (DVB-S, DAB)
Evangeliums-Rundfunk (FM, DVB-S, DAB+)
Jam FM (FM, DVB-S, DVB-C)
Klassik Radio (FM, DVB-S)
Radio Aktiv-FM (DVB-S)
Radio Horeb (DVB-S, DVB-T, FM, DAB+)
Radio Neue Hoffnung (DVB-S)
Radio Paloma (DVB-C, DAB+)
RTL Radio (FM, DVB-S, DVB-C)
Radio Teddy (FM, DVB-S, DAB+)
sunshine live (FM, DVB-S, DVB-T, DAB+)

Baden-Württemberg

Areal radio stations 

 big FM, Stuttgart (FM, DAB +)
 Hit-Radio Antenne 1 (FM, DAB +)
 Radio 7 (FM, DAB +)
 Radio Regenbogen (FM, DAB +, DVB-S)

Local radio stations 

 Baden FM (FM, DVB +)
 Die Neue 107.7 (FM, DAB +)
 Die neue Welle (FM, DAB +)
 Donau 3 FM (FM, DAB +)
 Hitradio Ohr (FM, DAB +)
 Hitradio MS One (FM)
 Radio Neckarburg (FM)
 Radio Seefunk (FM)
 Radio Ton (FM, DAB +)
 Regenbogen 2 (FM nur in Heilbronn/Odenwald/Rhein-Neckar, DAB +)

Noncommercial radio stations 
 Bermudafunk (FM)
 echo-fm 88,4 (FM)
 Freies Radio für Stuttgart (FM)
 Freies Radio Freudenstadt (FM)
 HoRadS (FM)
 Kanal Ratte, Schopfheim (FM)
 LernRadio, Karlsruhe (FM)
 Querfunk, Karlsruhe (FM)
 Radio Dreyeckland, Freiburg im Breisgau (FM)
 Radio freeFM, Ulm (FM)
 Radio StHörfunk, Schwäbisch Hall (FM)
 Wüste Welle, Tübingen (FM)

Bavaria

Statewide

 Antenne Bayern (FM, DVB-S)
 Radio Galaxy (DAB, FM not statewide)
 Rock Antenne (DAB, DVB-S, FM not statewide)
 KULTRADIO (DAB, Internet)
 egoFM (FM not statewide, DVB-S)

Munich and surrounding areas

 AFK M94.5 (FM)
 Be4 Classic Rock (DAB)
 Christliches Radio München (FM)
 egoFM (FM)
 Energy München (FM)
 LORA München (FM)
 Nova Radio (DAB)
 Radio 2Day (FM)
 Radio Arabella (FM)
 Radio Charivari (FM)
 Radio Deluxe (DAB)
 Radio Feierwerk (FM)
 Radio Gong 96,3 (FM)
 Radio Horeb (FM, DVB-S)
 Radio Opera (DAB)
 106.4 Top FM (FM)

Nuremberg and surrounding areas

 AFK max (FM)
 Camillo 92,9 (FM)
 Charivari 98,6 (FM)
 Energy Nürnberg (FM, DAB)
 Fantasy Bayern (DAB)
 Gong 97,1 (FM)
 Hit Radio N1 (FM)
 Jazztime Nürnberg (FM)
 Pirate Radio (DAB)
 Pray 92,9 (FM)
 Radio AREF (FM)
 Radio F (FM)
 Radio Meilensteine
 Radio Z (FM)
 Star FM (FM)
 Truckradio (DAB)
 Vil Radio (FM, DAB)

Augsburg and surrounding areas

 Fantasy Aktuell (DAB)
 Fantasy Bayern (DAB)
 hitradio.rt1 (FM)
 Radio Augsburg (DAB)
 Radio Fantasy (FM)
 Radio Kö (DAB)
 Smart Radio (DAB)

Würzburg and surrounding areas

 106,9 Radio Gong (FM)
 Radio Charivari Würzburg (FM)
 Radio Opera (FM)

Unterfranken (not including Würzburg)

 Radio Primaton (FM)
 Radio Primavera (FM)
 Radio Galaxy - Aschaffenburg (FM)

Oberfranken

 extra radio (FM)
 Radio Bamberg (FM)
 Radio Eins (FM)
 Radio Euroherz (FM)
 Radio Galaxy (FM)
 Radio Mainwelle (FM)
 Radio Plassenburg (FM)

Mittelfranken (not including Nuremberg)

 Radio 8 - Ansbach (FM)
 Radio Galaxy - Ansbach (FM)

Oberpfalz

 gong fm (FM)
 Radio Charivari Regensburg (FM)
 Radio Galaxy (FM)
 Radio Ramasuri (FM)

Niederbayern

 Radio AWN (FM)
 Radio Trausnitz (FM)
 Radio Galaxy (FM)
 unser Radio (Deggendorf) (FM)
 unser Radio (Passau) (FM)
 unser Radio (Regen) (FM)

Schwaben (not including Augsburg)

 Donau 3 FM (FM)
 Radio 30plus (FM)
 Radio Galaxy (FM)
 RSA-Radio Ostallgäu (FM)
 RT. 1 Südschwaben (FM)
 Das Neue RSA-Radio (FM)
 RT.1 Nordschwaben (FM)

Oberbayern (not including Munich)

 Ensemble am Chiemsee (FM)
 Inn-Salzach-Welle (FM)
 Radio Alpenwelle (FM)
 Radio Charivari Rosenheim (FM)
 Radio Chiemgau (FM)
 Radio Hitwelle (FM)
 Radio Galaxy (FM)
 Radio IN (FM)
 Radio Oberland (FM)
 Radio Regenbogen (FM)
 106.4 Top FM (FM)
 Untersberg live (FM)

Berlin and Brandenburg

BB Radio (FM)
Berliner Rundfunk 91,4 (FM)
Elsterwelle (FM)
ENERGY Berlin (FM)
100,6 Flux FM (FM)
HitRadio SKW (FM)
JAM FM (FM, DVB-C)
JazzRadio Berlin (FM)
98.8 Kiss FM (FM, DAB+)
Metropol FM (FM, DVB-C)
KCRW Berlin (FM)
Power Radio (FM)
Radio B2 (FM, DAB+)
94.5 Radio Cottbus (FM)
Radio Paloma (DAB+, DVB-C)
Radio Paradiso (FM)
Radio Russkij Berlin (FM)
Radio Teddy (FM)
104.6 RTL (FM, DVB-T)
94,3 rs2 (FM)
105'5 Spreeradio (FM, DVB-T)
Star FM (FM)
the wave (DVB-T)

Bremen

Energy Bremen (FM)

Hamburg

Alsterradio (FM)
Energy Hamburg (FM)
Oldie 95 (FM)
Radio Hamburg (FM)

Hesse

ERF (FM, DVB-S)
harmony.fm (FM, DVB-S)
Hit Radio FFH (FM, DVB-S)
Main FM (FM)
planet more music radio (FM, DVB-S)
Radio Bob (FM)

Lower Saxony

BBC - British Broadcasting Services (FM)
Bremen Vier (FM)
ffn (FM)
Hit-Radio Antenne (FM)

Northrhine-Westphalia

Local radio stations

107.8 Antenne AC (FM)
Antenne Düsseldorf (FM)
Antenne Münster  (FM)
Antenne Niederrhein (FM)
Antenne Unna (FM)
Hellweg Radio  (FM)
Hit Radio Vest (FM)
NE-WS 89.4  (FM)
Radio Emscher Lippe (FM)
Radio Aachen (FM)
Radio 90,1 Mönchengladbach  (FM)
Radio 91.2 (FM)
Radio Berg (FM)
Radio Bielefeld (FM)
98.5 Radio Bochum (FM)
Radio Bonn/Rhein-Sieg (FM)
Radio Duisburg (FM)
Radio en (FM)
Radio Erft  (FM)
Radio Essen (FM)
Radio Gütersloh (FM)
107.7 Radio Hagen (FM)
94.9 Radio Herford (FM)
Radio Herne 90acht (FM)
Radio Hochstift  (FM)
Radio Kiepenkerl (FM)
Radio Köln (FM)
Radio K.W. (FM)
Radio Leverkusen (FM)
Radio Lippe (FM)
Radio Lippewelle Hamm (FM)
Radio MK, Iserlohn (FM)
92.9 Radio Mülheim (FM)
Radio Neandertal  (FM)
Welle Niederrhein  (FM)
106.2 Radio Oberhausen (FM)
Radio RSG  (FM))
radio RST (FM)
Radio Rur  (FM)
Radio Sauerland (FM)
Radio Siegen (FM)
Radio WAF (FM)
Radio Westfalica (FM)
Radio WMW (FM)
Radio Wuppertal (FM)

Others
Antenne Bethel (FM)
Radio 30 plus (FM)
Radio 700 (FM, SW)
teutoRADIO plus (FM)

Mecklenburg-Vorpommern

103.3 Radio FDZ (FM)
Antenne Mecklenburg-Vorpommern (FM)
LOHRO
Ostseewelle (FM)

Rhineland-Palatinate

Statewide radio stations 
big FM (FM)
Radio RPR (FM)
Rockland Radio (FM)
RTL Radio (FM)

Local radio stations 

Antenne 98.0 (FM)
Antenne West (FM)
Metropol FM (FM)
Radio Quer (FM)
Studio Nahe (FM)
Radio Idar-Oberstein (FM)
Radio Pirmasens (FM)
Antenne Bad Kreuznach (FM)
Antenne Kaiserslautern (FM)
Antenne Pfalz (FM)
Antenne Landau (FM)

Saarland

Antenne West (FM, DAB)
big FM Saarland (FM, DAB)
Classic Rock Radio (FM, DAB)
Radyo Metropol FM (DAB)
Radio 99,6 (FM)
Radio Salü (FM, DAB)
roadRadio (DAB)
Rockland Radio (DAB)
RTL Radio (FM)

Saxony

Statewide radio stations 
apollo radio (FM)
Energy Sachsen (FM)
Hitradio RTL (FM)
Radio PSR (FM)
R.SA (FM)

Local radio stations 

Elsterwelle (FM)
Radio Chemnitz (FM)
Radio Dresden (FM)
Radio Erzgebirge (FM)
Radio Erzgebirge 107,7(FM)
Radio Lausitz (FM)
Radio Leipzig (FM)
Radio WSW (FM)
Radio Zwickau (FM)
SAEK (FM)
Vogtlandradio (FM)

Saxony-Anhalt

Radio Brocken (FM)
Radio SAW (FM, DAB)
Rockland Sachsen-Anhalt (FM)
89.0 RTL (FM)

Schleswig-Holstein

delta radio (FM)
Radio NORA (FM)
R.SH (FM)

Thuringia

Antenne Thüringen (FM)
Landeswelle Thüringen (FM)
Radio TOP 40 (FM)

Community radio

Baden-Württemberg

bermuda.funk (FM)
Freies Radio Freudenstadt (FM)
Freies Radio für Stuttgart (FM)
helle welle (FM)
Kanal Ratte (FM)
Querfunk (FM)
Radio Dreyeckland (FM)
free FM (FM)
Radio Kormista (FM)
Radio StHörfunk (FM)
Radio Wellenbrecher (FM)
Wüste Welle (FM)

Bavaria

Camillo 92,9 (FM)
Christliches Radio München (FM)
LORA München (FM)
Pray 92,9 (FM)
Radio AREF (FM)
Radio Feierwerk (FM)
Radio Horeb (FM)
Radio Meilensteine (FM)
Radio Z (FM)

Berlin

reboot.fm (FM)
Offener Kanal Berlin (FM)

Bremen

Radio Weser.TV (FM)

Hamburg

Freies Sender Kombinat (FM)
Tide 96,0 (FM)

Hesse

Freies Radio Kassel (FM)
Radio Darmstadt (FM)
Radio Rheinwelle (FM)
Radio Rüsselsheim (FM)
Radio Unerhört Marburg (FM)
Radio X (FM)
RundFunk Meißner (FM)

Mecklenburg-Vorpommern

LOHRO (FM)
NB-Radiotreff 88.0 (FM)
radio 98eins (FM)
Welle Kummerower See (FM)

Lower Saxony

Oldenburg eins (FM)
osradio (FM)
radio aktiv (FM)
Radio Flora (FM)
Radio Jade (FM)
Radio Marabu (FM)
Radio Okerwelle (FM)
Radio Ostfriesland (FM)
Radio Tonkuhle (FM)
Radio Umland (FM)
radioWSM (FM)
Radio ZuSa (FM)
StadtRadio Göttingen (FM)
Sturmwellensender (FM)

Northrhine-Westphalia

AJZ-Radiogruppe (FM)
Antenne Bethel (FM)
Bootbox Bielefeld (FM)
Bürgerfunk im Bergischen Land (FM)
Düsselwelle (FM)
Freies Radio Paderborn (FM)
Radio Joystick (FM)
Radio MikroWelle (FM)
Medienforum Münster (FM)
Neue Essener Welle (FM)
Radio Rosa Rauschen (FM)

Saxony

99drei Radio Mittweida (FM)
coloRadio (FM)
mephisto 97.6 (FM)
Radio Blau (FM)
Radio T (FM)

Saxony-Anhalt

Radio Corax (FM)
Radio HBW  (FM)
Freies Radio Naumburg (FM)

Schleswig-Holstein

Freie RadioCooperative (FM)
Offener Kanal Kiel/ Kiel FM (FM)
Offener Kanal Lübeck (FM)
Offener Kanal Westküste (FM)

Thuringia

Radio F.R.E.I. (FM)
Radio FunSWerk (FM)
Radio hsf (FM)
Radio Jena (FM)
Radio Lotte (FM)
Offener Kanal Nordhausen (FM)
MAX-FM (FM)
Wartburg-Radio (FM)

Campus radio

Baden-Württemberg

HoRadS, Stuttgart (FM)
RadioAktiv, Mannheim und Heidelberg (FM)
Radio Fri, Karlsruhe (FM)

Bavaria

 AFK M94.5 (FM)
 AFK max (FM)
 bit eXpress (DRM, DVB-H, DVB-T)
 FH-Campus Radio (DRM)
 Kanal C (FM)

Berlin and Brandenburg

 UniRadio Berlin-Brandenburg (FM)

Northrhine-Westphalia

 CampusFM (FM)
 CT das radio (FM)
 eldoradio* (FM)
 Hertz 87,9  (FM)
 Hochschulradio Aachen (FM)
 Hochschulradio Düsseldorf (FM)
 Kölncampus (FM)
 Radio 96,8 (FM)
 Radio Q (FM)
 Radio Triquency (FM)

Rhineland-Palatinate 
 Radio SRRP (also: Schulradio Rheinland-Pfalz)

Saxony

99drei Radio Mittweida (FM)
mephisto 97.6 (FM)

Radio stations of armed forces in Germany
 American Forces Network (MW, FM)
 British Forces Broadcasting Service (FM)
 Radio Forces Françaises de Berlin (FM)

Foreign radio stations broadcast in Germany
 BBC World Service (FM)
 National Public Radio (FM)
 Radio France Internationale (FM)
 Radio Free Europe (SW)
 (RadioRFM Home of African Music) www.cradior.com

See also
 Media of Germany

 
Germany